Abu'l-Ali Ma'mun ibn Muhammad (died 997) was ruler of Khwarazm from 995 until his death in 997. He was the founder of the Ma'munid dynasty, which lasted from 995 until 1017.

Ma'mun was originally the Samanid governor of southern Khwarazm, with his capital at Gurganj. In 995 he invaded northern Khwarazm and deposed the last Afrigid Shah Abu 'Abdallah Muhammad (who was also a Samanid vassal), uniting the province under his rule. Upon his death in 997, his son Abu al-Hasan Ali succeeded him.

References

Bosworth, C.E. "The Political and Dynastic History of the Iranian World (A.D. 1000-1217)." The Cambridge History of Iran, Vol. 4: The Saljuq and Mongol Periods. Ed. J.A. Boyle. Cambridge, UK: Cambridge University Press, 1968.

997 deaths
Year of birth unknown
10th-century Iranian people
Ma'munids